Jean Masarès was a French writer and film critic, laureate of the 1951 prix des Deux Magots.

Biography 
During the Second World War, Jean Masarès was a military nurse, notably in an insane asylum, which inspired him in the late 1940s with accounts of his experience in academic articles and symposia.

Works 
1950: Comme le pélican du désert, éditions Julliard — prix des Deux Magots 1951
1953: L'Inutile, éditions Julliard

References

External links 
 Palmarès du prix des Deux Magots on La Lettre du libraire

French film critics
20th-century French non-fiction writers
Prix des Deux Magots winners